Marudo is a comune (municipality) in the Province of Lodi in the Italian region Lombardy, located about  southeast of Milan and about  west of Lodi.

Marudo borders the following municipalities: Caselle Lurani, Castiraga Vidardo, Valera Fratta, Sant'Angelo Lodigiano, Villanterio.

References

Cities and towns in Lombardy